Foundry is an American hard rock band from Las Vegas. The band's current lineup consists of lead vocalist Kevin Lacerda, guitarist Chris Iorio, bassist Niko Gemini, and drummer Marc Brattin. Their newest singles, “Crocodile Tears” and “30,000 Feet” are released in 2023 and produced by Colin Brittain. While Foundry's roots are in classic rock, in 2021 they achieved success with their 3rd top 40 radio song in mainstream rock. Foundry has performed with notable acts such as Rob Zombie, Godsmack, Staind, Papa Roach, Scorpions, Whitesnake, Tesla, Queensrÿche, Bret Michaels, Night Ranger, Warrant, Skid Row, Saliva, FireHouse, Winger, and others.

History
In 2020, Foundry’s single, “Intoxicate”, spent 8 weeks in the Active Rock Radio Top 40 Chart. In 2019 they released original singles, “Intoxicate”, “Not This Time”, and “Thunder Rolls”, also produced by Colin Brittain. The band came out with two remakes, “Money” in 2020 and “Poker Face” in 2019. Foundry performed a 4th of July tribute LiveStream to pioneer new technology and hybrid audiences in response to the pandemic’s effect on live music.

Foundry released the single "Vegas Baby!" in December 2014. The band's self-titled album was released January 5, 2015. The record was mixed by Grammy-producer Steve Thompson with multi-platinum recording engineer Matt Breunig, and features guitarist Stoney Curtis and keyboardist Erik Norlander. Foundry's record has 10 songs and was recorded at Vegas View Recording. In March 2015, the band played at Count's Vamp'd in Las Vegas, where Keeling was inducted into the RockGodz Hall of Fame. Foundry was featured on Radio Narcea, 107.5 FM out of Oviedo, Spain, in January 2017.

Singles

Discography
Foundry, released January 2015

References

Rock music groups from Nevada
Musical groups from Las Vegas
Musical groups established in 2014
2014 establishments in Nevada